The North-South divide can refer to:

 North–South divide of the world (Global North and Global South)
 North–South divide in Belgium
 North–South divide in China
 North–South divide in Ireland
 North–South divide in Italy
 North–South divide in Korea
 North–South divide in Taiwan
 North–South divide in the United Kingdom
 North–South divide in England
 North–South divide in Scotland
 North–South divide in Wales
 North–South divide in the United States
 North–South divide in Vietnam